Boštjan Cesar (born 9 July 1982) is a Slovenian former professional footballer who played as a centre-back.

Cesar played in Slovenia, Croatia, France, England and Italy. With 101 international appearances, he is Slovenia's most capped player of all time, and represented them at the 2010 FIFA World Cup.

Club career
Cesar signed a three year-deal with Olympique de Marseille in 2005. He joined West Bromwich Albion on a season-long loan in August 2007, with a view to a permanent move. He made his debut for Albion in a 1–0 League Cup victory over Bournemouth on 14 August 2007. His league debut came more than two months later when West Bromwich defeated Blackpool 2–1 on 23 October 2007. He scored his only West Bromwich goal on 2 February 2008 in a 2–1 win against Burnley. Cesar made 24 appearances for West Bromwich in all competitions, but returned to Marseille at the end of the season after the manager Tony Mowbray decided against pursuing a permanent deal for the player.

He signed a two-year deal with Grenoble Foot 38 in January 2009 and scored his first goal for the club in his second appearance; a 1–1 draw against Girondins de Bordeaux. In May 2010, Chievo announced the capture of his signature on free transfer, and he officially joined them on 1 July. On 31 May 2011, he signed a new two-year contract.

International career
Cesar made his international debut on 12 February 2003, playing the entirety of a 5–1 friendly defeat to Switzerland in Nova Gorica. On 9 October 2004, he scored his first international goal to defeat Italy in a World Cup qualifier; it was Italy's only defeat as they went on to win the World Cup.

On 15 November 2014, he made his 81st appearance for the national team, surpassing Zlatko Zahovič as their most capped player of all time.

On 8 October 2017, Cesar became the first Slovenian player to earn 100 national team caps, in a 2–2 home draw with Scotland in the 2018 FIFA World Cup qualification. He was sent off at the end of the match. Cesar retired from the national team on 27 March 2018 in a home match against Belarus.

Career statistics

Club

International

Scores and results list Slovenia's goal tally first, score column indicates score after each Cesar goal.

Honours
Dinamo Zagreb
Prva HNL: 2002–03; runner-up: 2000–01, 2003–04
Croatian Cup: 2001–02, 2003–04
Croatian Supercup: 2002, 2003

Marseille
Ligue 1: runner-up 2006–07
Coupe de France: runner-up 2006, 2007

West Bromwich Albion
Football League Championship: 2007–08

See also
 List of footballers with 100 or more caps

Notes

External links

 Player profile at Olympique de Marseille
 Player profile at NZS 
 Player profile at LFP
 

1982 births
Living people
Footballers from Ljubljana
Slovenian footballers
Association football central defenders
Slovenian expatriate footballers
GNK Dinamo Zagreb players
NK Croatia Sesvete players
NK Olimpija Ljubljana (1945–2005) players
Croatian Football League players
First Football League (Croatia) players
Slovenian PrvaLiga players
Ligue 1 players
Olympique de Marseille players
English Football League players
West Bromwich Albion F.C. players
Grenoble Foot 38 players
Serie A players
Serie B players
A.C. ChievoVerona players
Expatriate footballers in Croatia
Expatriate footballers in France
Expatriate footballers in England
Expatriate footballers in Italy
Slovenian expatriate sportspeople in Croatia
Slovenian expatriate sportspeople in France
Slovenian expatriate sportspeople in England
Slovenian expatriate sportspeople in Italy
Slovenia youth international footballers
Slovenia under-21 international footballers
Slovenia international footballers
2010 FIFA World Cup players
FIFA Century Club
Slovenian football managers